The dialect of Castelmezzano is a Romance variety spoken in Castelmezzano in the Province of Potenza in Italy. It constitutes a dialect of the Neapolitan language that differs from the rest (and from neighbouring imported Gallo-Italic varieties) in its treatment of Latin back vowels, showing an evolution more reminiscent of Balkan Romance: Latin /ŭ/ merges with /ū/ rather than with /ō/.

It includes Castronuovo di Sant'Andrea, Sant'Arcangelo, Roccanova, San Martino d'Agri, Aliano (and Alianello), Gallicchio, Missanello, Armento, Pietrapertosa, Anzi, Campomaggiore, Albano di Lucania, Trivigno, Brindisi di Montagna, Corleto Perticara and Guardia Perticara.

This type of vocalism may once have been characteristic of most of southern Italy and possibly even other areas that now have Italo-Western vowel outcomes. It can be viewed as a compromise, in that it has a Sardinian-like treatment of the back vowels, as is also observed in the southern part of the Lausberg area, while also having an Italo-Western-like treatment of the front vowels (merging Latin /ĭ/ with /ē/), as found in other varieties of Neapolitan.

Comparison of vowel changes 

A comparison of vowel changes shows only limited relatability of the languages and the dialect yet Dalmatian sound changes may sometimes differ from the usual phonological development that can be ascertained.

References

Italo-Dalmatian languages
Eastern Romance languages